Rosie Goldschmidt Waldeck (August 24, 1898 – August 8, 1982) born Rosa Goldschmidt, also known as Rosie Waldeck and by several other variants of her name, was the author of several works including Prelude to the past; the autobiography of a woman and Athene Palace. The former narrates, among other things, the 1930 spy trial involving Berlin publisher Ullstein-Verlag (she was married at the time to Dr. Franz Ullstein, a son of Leopold Ullstein); the latter narrates events in elite diplomatic circles in Bucharest, Romania during World War II.

Waldeck was a German-born Jew, who later became a Catholic and (on April 3, 1939) an American. She was born into a banking family, and in 1920 received a doctorate in sociology from the University of Heidelberg, where she studied under Alfred Weber. From the 1930s, she was based in the United States. She was in Bucharest from June 1940 to January 1941 as a correspondent for Newsweek: Her book Athene Palace narrates this sojourn; the title refers to the Athénée Palace hotel, "short of one 'e' and of accents for no other reason than simplicity and readability."

The surname Waldeck came from the German count Armin Wolrad Graf von Waldeck, who was at least her third husband. She was earlier married to German-born medical doctor and scientist Ernst Gräfenberg and to the aforementioned Dr. Franz Ullstein.

Works 
 Prelude to the past; the autobiography of a woman (1934)
 Athene Palace (1942)
 Meet Mr. Blank, The Leader of Tomorrow's Germans (1943)
 Lustre in the Sky (1946)
 The Emperor's Duchess (1948)
 Europe Between The Acts (1951)
Source for list:

Notes

External links 
 Catalog Entry R. G. Waldeck at the German National Library

1898 births
1984 deaths
20th-century American memoirists
German memoirists
German Roman Catholics
Jewish emigrants from Nazi Germany to the United States
American Roman Catholics
Converts to Roman Catholicism from Judaism
Romania in World War II
Heidelberg University alumni